The following list provides information relating to the (gross) minimum wages (before tax & social charges) of in the European Union member states.

The calculations are based on the assumption of a 40-hour working week and a 52-week year, with the exceptions of France (35 hours), Belgium (38 hours), Ireland (39 hours), and Germany (39.1 hours).

Most of EU countries minimum wages are fixed at a monthly rate, but there are some countries where minimum wage is fixed at an hourly rate or a weekly rate.

European countries on the gross minimum wage before tax & social charges:

 

Countries marked on the map in green have a minimum wage above €2000, in blue in the range from €1000 to €2000, in orange from €500 to €1000, in red below €500. Countries marked on the map in purple do not have a minimum wage.

Minimum wages by EU member states

EU member states with no minimum wage
   Austria 
  Denmark
   Finland
  Sweden 
   Italy

See also 
 List of European countries by minimum wage (Gross/Net)
 List of European Union member states by average wage
 List of European Union member states by unemployment rate
 Economy of the European Union
 List of European countries by average wage
 List of European countries by budget revenues per capita
 List of European countries by GNI (nominal) per capita
 List of countries by GDP (nominal)
 List of countries by GDP (PPP)

References

External links 
 Minimum wages Eurostat
 Monthly minimum wages – bi-annual Eurostat
 Minimum Wage in Europe Google – public data
 Minimum wages in Central Eastern Europe Database Central Europe
 Minimum Wage – Bulgaria WageIndicator Foundation

Countries by minimum wage
Wages and salaries
Minimum wage
Member states by minimum wage